The Berne Witness is a newspaper based in Berne, Indiana, United States. It covers local community news with a circulation of 1,600. The paper was founded in 1896 as a 3-issue-per-week, bi-lingual, Prohibitionist newspaper. The Berne Witness was also referred to as the official printing house of the Mennonite Church of the United States. Every issue had two pages published in German for the town's mostly Swiss and German immigrants. For the largest immigrant group in Indiana, this was important to help immigrants maintain their cultural identity while integrating into their new country.

Founding 
The paper was founded in July 1896 by Fred Rohrer, a devout Mennonite and Prohibitionist. While campaigning to make the town dry, Rohrer was run from town, beaten up on four occasions, and had his house dynamited while he and his wife were sleeping by the saloon owners of the town. Interestingly enough his paper prospered during this time and gained more subscriptions.

History 

1896 founded as the Berne Witness by Fred Rohrer.
 1922 became the Adams County Witness, published by Berne Witness Co. the paper became English language only.
 1932 name was changed back to Berne Witness.
 1974 Publishers Print House became publisher and changed the name to Adams County Sun and Berne Daily Witness. Published daily except for Sundays.
 1993 became the Berne Tri-Weekly. Publisher Sine nomine. The paper again became a 3-issue-per-week edition.

Current Status 

 2016 the paper reverted to its original Berne Witness name. It is once again published three times a week as well as online.

References

External links 

Twitter: @bernewitness
Instagram: Bernewitness
Facebook: https://www.facebook.com/thebernewitness/

Newspapers published in Indiana
Adams County, Indiana